A suicide bombing was carried out on 29 March 2002 by 18-year-old Ayat al-Akhras, who blew herself up at the entrance of the main supermarket in the Jerusalem neighborhood of Kiryat HaYovel, killing three people and injuring 28. Hamas claimed responsibility for the attack.

The attack

On 29 March 2002, during the afternoon, Ayat al-Akhras, an 18-year-old Palestinian woman, approached the Kiryat Yovel supermarket in Jerusalem. The supermarket at the time was full of customers shopping for the weekend.

Haim Smadar, the 55-year-old security guard who guarded the entrance to the supermarket and spoke Arabic, became suspicious after two Arabic women who usually sold vegetables outside the shop entrance had been warned by Akhras to leave. Akhras detonated the explosives at the entrance to the store while struggling with Smadar, killing him and Rachel Levy, a 17-year-old Israeli girl. In addition, about 30 people were injured in the attack. Smadar managed to forcefully keep her away from the crowd, thus preventing a larger loss of life had the attack taken place inside the store.

After the attack, it was discovered that the suicide bomber was also carrying an unexploded mortar bomb.

When news of the bombing reached Dheisheh, some of the residents celebrated, handing out candies and firing guns in the air.

The perpetrator 
Hamas claimed responsibility for the attack and identified the suicide bomber as 18-year-old Ayat al-Akhras from the Deheishe Refugee Camp near Bethlehem. Intelligence reports indicate that Akhras was impregnated by a Fatah operative, despite being an unmarried teenager, and that the emotional and social consequences of her unplanned pregnancy were the primary reason she decided to commit a suicide attack. al-Akhras was the third female suicide bomber of the Al-Aqsa Intifada.  Akhras' father worked for an Israeli construction firm. The family lived in a three-story home he built. Akhras, a straight-A student, was engaged to be married in July 2002. She joined the Al-Aqsa Martyrs' Brigades and was trained for several weeks before being sent to the Kiryat HaYovel supermarket in southwestern Jerusalem. Before the attack, Akhras made a video criticizing the Muslim world. She said: "I say to the Arab leaders, stop sleeping. Stop failing to fulfill your duty. Shame on the Arab armies who are sitting and watching the girls of Palestine fight while they are asleep."

Official reactions
US president George W. Bush condemned the attack, stating: "When an 18-year-old Palestinian girl is induced to blow herself up, and in the process kills a 17-year-old Israeli girl, the future itself is dying, the future of the Palestinian people and the future of the Israeli people." He also called on Yasser Arafat to convey a clear message to terrorists that blowing themselves up did not help the cause of the Palestinians.

Aftermath
After the bombing, Ayat became an icon in Bethlehem and was hailed as a martyr and role model at Al Quds University.  She was praised by American university professor Julio Pino.

Then Saudi Ambassador to the UK, Dr Ghazi Abdul Rahman Al Gosaibi, a leading politician in Saudi Arabia, wrote a  poem in praise of al-Akhras in 2002.

In 2007 HBO released the documentary film "To Die in Jerusalem" which focuses on the stories of Akhras and 17-year-old Rachel Levy, who was killed in the attack. The film documents the efforts of Rachel's mother Avigail Levy to meet with Um Samir al-Akhras, mother of al-Akhras.

The novel 

"Prima di Lasciarsi" (Before We Say Goodbye) by Gabriella Ambrosio is the novel based on this supermarket bombing.  The story begins at seven o'clock in the morning on the day of the attack and ends with the explosion. Despite the very short time span – seven hours – seen from the points of view of the different characters, the book tries to portray the complex reality between Israel and Palestine.The book was published in Italy in 2004 by Nutrimenti and was awarded at the Festival du Premier Romance in Chambéry, France. In 2008 the book's publication in both in Arabic and Hebrew was sponsored by Amnesty International and employed by Israeli colleges and human rights organizations working in Israel and the Palestinian Territories as an educational tool. It has then been published in the UK, Australia, and in New Zealand by Walker Books, in France as "Deuze Heures Avant"(Gallimard),in Germany as "Der Himmel uber Jerusalem" (Fischer Verlag) as well as in Spain (Noguer), Turkey (Remzi Kitabevi), Greece (Psichogios), Korea (JoongAng) and China (Jieli publishing house). It is actually studied in universities in UK and Canada as an example of human rights literature.

References

Terrorist incidents in Jerusalem
2002 in Jerusalem
Attacks on supermarkets
March 2002 events in Asia
Hamas suicide bombings
Islamic terrorist incidents in 2002
Terrorist incidents in Jerusalem in the 2000s